Maria Fernanda Lay (born 1954) is a politician in East Timor. She has been a member of the National Parliament of East Timor since 2007.

Early life and education 
Maria Fernanda Lay was born in 1954 in Baucau, East Timor. She holds a bachelor's degree from a telecommunications school in Bandung, Indonesia.

Career 
While Indonesia still occupied East Timor, Lay worked as a manager at Timor Telecom. She later worked as a project manager for the U.S. Agency for International Development.

Lay subsequently pursued a political career as a member of the National Congress for Timorese Reconstruction (CNRT) party. She first gained a seat in the National Parliament of East Timor in the 2007 elections, taking office on August 6, 2007. In her time in Parliament, she has served in leadership roles on various commissions.

Since 2010, she has served as secretary of her national group at the Parliamentary Assembly of the Community of Portuguese Language Countries. She also led the body's Women's Network from 2010 to 2015.

On June 17, 2020, Lay made headlines for her involvement in a verbal and physical fight on the floor of the National Parliament with fellow legislator Olinda Guterres. After Lay spoke Portuguese during a debate, Guterres criticized her and argued she should instead have spoken in Tetum, a more commonly spoken language in East Timor.

Lay pointed out that the Constitution designates Portuguese as an official language of East Timor. She criticized Guterres in turn for allegedly having made racist comments, saying that the rival lawmaker had called her a china pirata ("Chinese pirate"). The two began physically fighting, and they had to be separated by other legislators.

References 

Living people
1954 births
People from Baucau District
East Timorese women in politics
Members of the National Parliament (East Timor)
East Timorese people of Chinese descent